The equipment of the Royal Malaysian Navy can be subdivided into: ship, aircraft, radar, weapon, munition, firearm and attire. All RMN ship carries the prefix KD (Malay : Kapal Di-Raja, literally "Royal Ship"), which is equivalent to "His Majesty's Ship" in English. The sailing ship however, carries the KLD prefix (Kapal Layar Di-Raja) to mean "His Majesty's Sailing Ship".

Ship

Aircraft

Radar

Weapon

Munition

Firearm
The standard weapon of all RMN personnel is Glock 17, Heckler & Koch P9S service pistols, M4 carbines, M16 rifles and FN MAG 58 general purpose machine guns. The RMN PASKAL units are often equipped with the most common specialised firearms including combat shotguns, submachine guns, assault rifles, carbines, sniper rifles, light machine guns, and grenade-based weapons that are generally found in most counter-terrorist tactical teams. The following are some of the weapons of the RMN ground forces:

Attire

Procurement
Following the completion of the New Generation Patrol Vessel (NGPV) program, RMN now moved to the next program called Second Generation Patrol Vessel (SGPV). RMN also planned to purchase a batch of Littoral Mission Ship (LMS) and Multi Role Support Ship (MRSS). Under recent modernisation plan also, RMN desire to add more submarine in the fleet. Together with the modernisation plan, RMN also launches the upgrade program and Service Life Extension Program (SLEP) for the old navy's ship.

See also
 List of equipment of the Malaysian Army
 List of equipment of the Royal Malaysian Air Force
 List of aircraft of the Malaysian Armed Forces
 List of equipment of the Malaysian Maritime Enforcement Agency
 List of vehicles of the Royal Malaysian Police
 List of police firearms in Malaysia

References

External links
 Official website of the Royal Malaysian Navy
 Global Security website

Equipment of the Royal Malaysian Navy
Royal Malaysian Navy
Malaysian Navy